I Want You Back! Unreleased Masters is a Jackson 5 compilation released to celebrate the 40th anniversary of the band's debut on Motown Records; their debut single "I Want You Back" was issued October 7, 1969. The compilation, specifically designed to fit like a regular 1970s-era album, contains previously unreleased songs and alternate versions of some of the group's hits.

Track listing

References

2009 compilation albums
Motown compilation albums
The Jackson 5 compilation albums